The Kneeling,  ("Upon Their Knees", "Crouching") is the 45th  chapter (surah) of the Qur'an with 37 verses (ayat). It is a Meccan chapter,  believed revealed according to the Islamic tradition during the Meccan phase of Muhammad's prophethood. This is one of the seven chapters in the Qur'an that start with the Muqattaʿat Hāʼ Mīm. It contains discussions of "signs of God" for humankind to reflect on, and describes punishments for those who deny God despite the signs. It also contains the only Quranic verse mentioning sharia, a term which Muslims later use to refer to the Islamic law.

Summary
The chapter starts with the Muqattaʿat Hāʼ Mīm, the sixth of seven Quranic chapters to do so. The following verses (2–15) discuss the "signs of God", such as the order in nature as well as its ability to serve humanity. The verses exhort mankind to reflect upon those signs and warn them of the punishment for those who turn away from God despite the signs. 

Verse 16 talks about the Children of Israel, whom it says were sent with the Book (Torah) and multiple prophets, and were "favored above the world". The following verse, however, criticized the Jews of Medina for rejecting the message of Muhammad.

Verse 18 is the only verse in the Quran that explicitly mentions the term sharia. A partial translation of the verse reads: "We have ordained for you a sharia to live in line with". Linguistically, the Arabic term sharia means "a straight, smooth path that leads to water", which in the context of Arabian desert culture could also mean "a path to salvation from death". This term later became a technical term for the Islamic law, but according to scholar of Islam Bassam Tibi, this term was initially understood as referring to a morality, not law.

The remaining verses (20–37) contain Quranic descriptions of the Judgment Day and the fate of those who deny the signs of God, i.e. the nonbelievers. Verse 28 describes that "every community will be upon its knees" on Judgment Day, a passage which gives the chapter its name.

Ayat (verses)
1 The Quran a revelation from God
2-5 God revealed in his works
6-10 Punishment of those who reject the Quran 
11-12 God’s mercy seen in his works of providence
13-14 Muslims exhorted to forgive the unbelievers
15-16 The Book of the law, wisdom, and prophecy given to the Israelites
17-19 Muhammad received the Quran
20 The wicked and just not rewarded alike
21-22 Unbelievers and idolaters threatened
23-25 God the author of life, therefore may raise the dead
26-34 Contrasted condition of believers and unbelievers in the judgment
35-37 Praise to the Lord of the universe

Revelation history
According to the Islamic tradition, Al-Jathiya is a Meccan sura, that is, a chapter revealed during the Meccan phase of Muhammad's prophethood. Some Islamic scholars, however, believed that the verse 14—unlike the rest of the chapter—were revealed during the Medinan phase.

The Quranic commentator Ibn al-Jawzi (d. 1200) believes the chapter was revealed immediately after the revelation of Al-Dukhan. The traditional Egyptian chronology puts the chapter's revelation order as after al-Dukhan (al-Jathiya at 65th while al-Dukhan is at 64th). The Nöldeke Chronology (by the orientalist Theodor Nöldeke) puts it as the 72nd, not after al-Dukhan but after the chapter Fussilat.

Names 
The name al-Jathiya ("The Kneeling") comes from a phrase in verse 28 which says that "every community will be upon its knees" on the Judgement Day. It is also called al-Dahr ("Time") after the word's presence in verse 24. Another name is al-Shariah, because the chapter is the only one in the Quran explicitly mentioning the term "sharia".

References

Citations

Bibliography

External links

Jathiya